The mixed doubles tournament of the 2019 BWF World Championships (World Badminton Championships) takes place from 19 to 25 August.

Seeds 

The seeding list is based on the World Rankings from 30 July 2019.

  Zheng Siwei / Huang Yaqiong (champions)
  Wang Yilü / Huang Dongping (semifinals)
  Yuta Watanabe / Arisa Higashino (semifinals)
  Dechapol Puavaranukroh / Sapsiree Taerattanachai (final)
  Chan Peng Soon / Goh Liu Ying (quarterfinals)
  Praveen Jordan / Melati Daeva Oktavianti (third round)
  Seo Seung-jae / Chae Yoo-jung (quarterfinals)
  Marcus Ellis / Lauren Smith (third round)

  Tang Chun Man / Tse Ying Suet (quarterfinals)
  Hafiz Faizal / Gloria Emanuelle Widjaja (third round)
  Chris Adcock / Gabby Adcock (third round)
  Goh Soon Huat / Shevon Jemie Lai (second round)
  He Jiting / Du Yue (second round)
  Tan Kian Meng / Lai Pei Jing (third round)
  Nipitphon Phuangphuapet / Savitree Amitrapai (third round)
  Lu Kai / Chen Lu (third round)

Draw

Finals

Top half

Section 1

Section 2

Bottom half

Section 3

Section 4

References

2019 BWF World Championships
World Championships